This list covers television programs whose first letter (excluding "the") of the title is F.

F

FA
FABLife
The Fabulous Life of...
The Face Is Familiar
The Facts of Life
Face the Nation
Face Off
Faerie Tale Theatre
Fair City
The Fairly OddParents
The Fairly OddParents: Fairly Odder
Fairy Tail
Falcón
Falcon Crest
The Fall Guy
Falling Skies
Falling Water
Faking It (2000)
Faking It (2014)
Fam
Fame
The Family (UK)
Family
Family Affair (1966)
Family Affair (2002)
Family Affairs
Family Album
Family Biz
Family Challenge
Family Feud
A Family for Joe
Family Fortunes
Family Game Night
The Family Genius
Family Guy
The Family Law (Australia)
Family Law (US)
Family Matters
The Family-Ness
Family Reunion
Family Ties
Famous and Fearless (UK)
Famous 5: On the Case
The Famous Five
Famous Food
Famous in Love
Famously Single
Fanboy & Chum Chum
Fancy Nancy
Fantastic Four
Fantastic Four: World's Greatest Heroes
The Fantastic Journey
Fantastic Max
Fantasy Island
Fargo
Farmer Wants a Wife
Farscape
Fashionably Late with Rachel Zoe
Fashion House
Fashion Police
Fashion Star
The Fashion Show
Fast Cars and Superstars: The Gillette Young Guns Celebrity Race
Fast Forward
The Fast Lane (Australia)
Fast Layne
Fast Money
The Fast Show
Fast Track (UK)
Fastlane
Fat Albert and the Cosby Kids
Fat Guy Stuck in Internet
Father Brown (1974)
Father Brown (2013)
Father Dowling Mysteries
Fatherhood
Father Knows Best
Father Murphy
Father of the Pride
Father Ted
Fat March
Fawlty Towers
Fay

FB
FBI
FBI
FBI: International
FBI: Most Wanted
The F.B.I.
The FBI Files
FBoy Island

FC
FCW

FE
Fear
Fear Factor
Fear Itself
Fear the Walking Dead
The Feed (Australia)
Felicity
Felix the Cat
Felony Squad
Female Forces
Fernwood 2-Night
Ferris Bueller
Fetch! with Ruff Ruffman
Feud

FI
Fifi and the Flowertots (UK)
Fifteen To One
The Flight Attendant
Fight Back! With David Horowitz
Figure It Out
Os Filhos do Rock
Fillmore!
Filthy Rich & Catflap
Filthy Rich: Cattle Drive
Final Space
The Finder
Finders Keepers (Australia)
Finders Keepers (UK) (1981)
Finders Keepers (UK) (1991)
Finders Keepers (US)
Finding Carter
Finding Sarah
Fireflies (Australia)
Firefly
Firehouse
The Firm
The First 48
The First 48: Missing Persons
First Family of Hip Hop
First Look
First Monday
First Take
First Wave (Canada)
F is for Family
Fish Hooks
Fishing With John
Fishtronaut (Brazil)
Fit for Fashion
Five Fingers
Five Star Jubilee
The Fix
Fix & Foxi and Friends
Fixer Upper

FL
The Flash (1990)
The Flash (2014)
Flambards
Flamingo Road
FlashForward
Flash Forward
Flash Gordon (1954)
Flash Gordon (1996)
Flash Gordon (2007)
Flashpoint
Flavor of Love
Flex & Shanice
The Flintstones
The Flintstone Kids
Flight 29 Down
Flight of the Conchords
Flikken
Flip or Flop
Flip or Flop
Flip or Flop Atlanta
Flip or Flop Chicago
Flip or Flop Follow-Up
Flip or Flop Fort Worth
Flip or Flop Nashville
Flip or Flop Vegas
Flip That House
Flip This House
The Flip Wilson Show
Flipper (1964)
Flipper (1995)
Flipping Out
Flo
Floribama Shore
Flower Pot Men
The Flumps (British)
Fly Girls
Fly Tales
The Flying Nun
Flying Rhino Junior High
Floogals
Floor is Lava

FO
Foley Square
The Following
Food Network Challenge
Food Network Star
Food Party
Football Night in America
Football Superstar
For All Mankind
For Better or for Worse
Forbidden Science
Force Five
Ford Theatre
Forensic Files
Forever
Forever Knight
Forgive or Forget
The Forgotten
For the Love of Ray J
Fortune Hunter
For Peete's Sake
For the People (1965)
For the People (2002)
For the People (2018)
Fortune: Million Pound Giveaway
Fosse/Verdon
Foster's Home for Imaginary Friends
The Fosters
Foundation
The Four: Battle for Stardom
Four Eyes!
Four Feather Falls (UK)
The Four Just Men
Four Live (Ireland)
Four Live (New Zealand)
Four Star Playhouse
Four Weddings (Australia)
Four Weddings (UK)
Fox & Friends
Fox News Live
Fox News Sunday
Fox NFL Kickoff
Fox NFL Sunday
Fox Online
Foyle's War (British)

FR
Fraggle Rock
Frank the Entertainer in a Basement Affair
Franklin
Franklin and Friends
Franny's Feet (Canada)
Frasier
Freakazoid
Freaks and Geeks
FreakyLinks
Freaky Stories (Canada)
Fred's Head
Fred Flintstone and Friends
Fred: The Show
The Fred Waring Show
Freddie
Freedom Fighters: The Ray
Freefonix (UK)
Freewheelers
Frequency
The Fresh Beat Band
Fresh Meat
Fresh Off the Boat
The Fresh Prince of Bel-Air
Freshwater Blue (Australia)
Friday Night Lights
Fridays
Friend or Foe?
Friends
Friends and Lovers
Friendzone
Fries with That?
Fringe
Frisky Dingo
Forever Eden
Frontier Circus
Frontier Doctor
Frontier Justice
Frontiers (1989)
Frontiers (1996)
Frontline (Australia)

FT
F Troop

FU
Fugget About It (Canada)
The Fugitive
Full Frontal (Australia)
Full Frontal with Samantha Bee
Full House
The Full Sun (South Korea)
Fuller House
The Funky Phantom
The Funny Company
Funny You Should Ask (1968)
Funny You Should Ask (2017)
Fury
Futurama
The Future Is Wild (Canada)
Future Weapons
Future Worm
The Furchester Hotel

FW
The F Word (UK)
The F Word (US)

FZ 

 F-Zero: GP Legend

Previous:  List of television programs: E    Next:  List of television programs: G